Cruise Critic is a cruise ship review site. Annually in December, it publishes the Cruise Critic Editors’ Picks Awards, which recognize the best cruise lines of the year in various categories.

History
The site was co-founded in 1995 by Anne Campbell as a feature of America Online.

In 2003, it averaged 10.5 million page views per month and had 62,000 registered members.

In 2007, it was acquired by TripAdvisor.

External links

References

Tripadvisor
American review websites
American travel websites
American companies established in 1995
Transport companies established in 1995
Internet properties established in 1995
2007 mergers and acquisitions
Cruising (maritime)